Elena Sergeevna Katina (born 4 October 1984), better known as Lena Katina, is a Russian musician who gained fame as one half of the pop/electronica duo t.A.T.u. She started her career at the age of eight, joining the Russian children's act Avenue, soon after that joining Neposedy. In 1999, producer Ivan Shapovalov chose Katina and Julia Volkova for his project t.A.T.u. The duo would later become Russia's most successful pop music act. The group produced several hits, including "All the Things She Said", "Not Gonna Get Us", and "All About Us".
Their first single, "All the Things She Said", peaked at No. 1 in nineteen countries, including the UK, Russia, and Australia.

In 2009, Katina began a solo career, which caused t.A.T.u. to go on hiatus. In 2011, the duo officially split, with Volkova also pursuing a solo path. That year, Katina released her first mainstream single, "Never Forget", which reached No. 1 on the MTV Russia Top 10 and also won the MTV Russia – 2011 Video of the Year. The track also reached No. 1 on the US Billboard Hot Dance Club Play and rose to first place in Greece.

In 2014, Katina released her debut album, This Is Who I Am, which was reissued in Spanish under the name Esta Soy Yo two years later. In 2019, she released her second album, Mono.

Early years

Katina was born in Moscow on 4 October 1984 to musician Sergey Katin. Starting at just four years old, on her father's initiative, Katina began to attend various sport and music clubs. When she was seven, Katina began regular school and within a year, she entered music school for piano classes. When she was ten, she joined the children's group Avenue as a soloist, singing with the ensemble for the next three years. When she was thirteen, she became a member of the vocal and instrumental group Neposedy, where she met Julia Volkova, and the two became friends. At the age of fourteen, she was successfully cast as a member of the pop duo t.A.T.u., together with Volkova.

Music career

1999–2014: t.A.T.u.

Creator and then-manager of t.A.T.u., Ivan Shapovalov, has stated that the idea for the group stemmed from the common male fascination with schoolgirl lesbian lovers.

After auditioning 400 girls, Shapovalov selected Katina at the age of fourteen. With the project still in development, Katina had the opportunity to record demos, including "Belochka" and "Yugoslavia". The then-fourteen-year-old Julia Volkova was added to the project some time afterward, and in 2001, the duo rose to popularity in Russia and later in the world.

Feeling satisfied with his choices, Shapovalov signed Volkova and Katina to t.A.T.u., but the contract also demanded that the girls present a lesbian image. After breaking away in 2004, the girls came clean and stated that Shapovalov had created the image, and that they were even told what to say in interviews.

t.A.T.u. soon became the most successful Russian group of all time, leaving a number of hits behind them, such as "All the Things She Said", "Not Gonna Get Us", and "All About Us". They took part in the 2003 Eurovision Song Contest, finishing third with "Ne Ver', Ne Boysia".
In 2007, Katina, along with Volkova, appeared in the film You and I, with Mischa Barton playing the lead role. Based on the 2006 Aleksey Mitrofanov novel t.A.T.u. Come Back, itself loosely based on the story of the pop duo, it was directed by Roland Joffe and presented at the Cannes Film Festival in 2008. The film was released in 2011 and 2012 in Russia and the United States, respectively.

In March 2011, t.A.T.u. officially disbanded and rumours appeared that Katina would release a solo album the same year. The duo celebrated their twelve years together by releasing two remix albums, entitled Waste Management Remixes pt. 1 and Waste Management Remixes pt. 2.

2010–2016: Solo career: This Is Who I Am and Esta Soy Yo

Katina hosted a fan event at The Trail in Los Angeles on 29 May 2010 and gave her first solo performance the next day at the Troubador. She was the opening act of PrideFest in Milwaukee on 12 June 2010 and on the same day, she released a free download of a song from her upcoming album, titled "Lost in this Dance". Alongside the release of this track, Katina recorded the single "Guardian Angel" with Canadian post-hardcore band Abandon All Ships, which was featured on their 2010 debut album, Geeving. On 17 June 2011, Katina's single "Never Forget" premiered on Mexican radio station FMTU 103–7 in Monterrey. The single, once available on iTunes, also included the song "Stay".

Katina and her band appeared on Rawsession, where they performed original acoustic versions of Owl City's "Deer in the Headlights", Alexandra Stan's "Mr. Saxobeat", and her own "Never Forget". The three tracks were later released as an EP titled RAWsession 07.14.11.

On 19 September 2011, Katina released the song "Waiting" and on 9 December 2011, "Keep on Breathing" came out. The latter track was used to raise funds for children affected by the earthquake and tsunami in Japan.

In September 2012, Katina collaborated with Russian rapper T-Killah on the track "SHOT".

On 17 March 2014, Katina released her first live album, European Fan Weekend 2013 Live, which included her solo material as well as a number of t.A.T.u. tracks. In September, she announced via Facebook that her debut studio album, This Is Who I Am, would be released on 18 November 2014, preceded by the single "Who I Am" on 7 October. On 12 March 2015, the album's fourth single, An Invitation, aired.
In July 2016, a Spanish version of This Is Who I Am was released, under the title Esta Soy Yo.

2017–present: Mono, All Together Now!, and The Masked Singer
In October 2017, Katina released her new English-language single "Silent Hills". In December, she published the song "Here I Go Again", a collaboration with Daddy Mercury.
On 3 March 2018, she released the Russian-language ballad "после нас" ("After Us"), a nostalgic retrospective on her time with t.A.T.u. This was followed by three more Russian-language singles later that year: "Косы" ("Braids"), "Куришь" ("You Smoke"), and "Макдоналдс" ("McDonald's").
In 2019, Katina published the singles "Стартрек" ("Star Trek") in April and "Моно" ("Mono") in June. Later the same month, she announced the upcoming release of her first Russian-language opus, titled Моно. The eight-track album was released on 26 July. In November, another single, "Никогда" ("Never"), came out.

In 2020, Lena Katina joined ex-Neposedy member Sergey Lazarev as a judge on Russia-1's reality competition series All Together Now!/Ну-ка, все вместе!, where a contestant's singing ability is judged by a team of 100 musicians. Alongside Katina, the panel of judges included Valentina Pyatchenko and
Yekaterina Shklyayeva, members of the ethno-pop group Buranovskiye Babushki. She also made an appearance on the Russian edition of The Masked Singer as Spider/Паук. She was eliminated from the show on 13 April, landing in sixth place.

Katina released a number of singles in 2020, including "Virus", "Killing Me Softly", "Crybaby", and an English version of "Никогда", titled "Nevermind". Her acoustic EP Акустика (Acoustics) was published in April.
In June 2021, she released the single "Из темноты".

On 27 January 2023, she released the single "Tакси" ("Taxi"), from her upcoming Russian-language album, манекен ("mannequin"), which is set to be released on February 24.

Personal life
Katina married her boyfriend of three years, Slovenian musician Sasha Kuzmanović, in 2013. She announced in November 2014 that she was three-and-a-half months pregnant with her first child during a concert in Rome and gave birth to a son on 22 May 2015. In 2019, Katina and Kuzmanović divorced. In June 2021, Katina revealed that she was in a relationship with Russian businessman Dmitry Spiridonov, the CEO of CloudPayments.

Support for the LGBT community
In September 2012, Katina and her band performed at the international festival Queerfest in Saint Petersburg. She stated, "We all are very different people and we should celebrate our differences. We should not be silent when we see this intolerant aggression towards LGBT-community". The organisers noted that "Lena's participation in Queerfest is a truly historic moment: For the first time such a high-profile Russian artist supports the festival".

In September 2014, Katina's former t.A.T.u. bandmate, Julia Volkova, appeared as a contestant on a Ukrainian game show called Lie Detector and made comments considered to be highly homophobic, especially towards gay men. Katina reacted, saying:

Feud with Julia Volkova
In 2010, Julia Volkova expressed her opinion on Lena's solo career, saying, "[Lena] has the right to [sing t.A.T.u. songs], but it's so stupid, absolutely stupid. If you do a solo career, it means that you do your own work. Her stuff, that she makes, I think, is silly and very soon her career will wither away and disappear". Katina responded to this interview via her YouTube page, saying, "I saw Julia's interview. Of course I got upset. But I want to tell everybody that I have a completely opposite attitude towards the whole situation, Julia's project included. I believe she's a very talented person and I sincerely hope that she'll be successful in all the things she plans". The group officially disbanded in 2011.

While the duo reunited briefly in 2012–2014, with a performance at The Voice of Romania while promoting the re-released edition of 200 km/h in the Wrong Lane, a concert in Kyiv, and a pre-opening performance at the 2014 Winter Olympics in Sochi, on 17 February 2014, Katina posted a video message on her official YouTube channel, stating that she would no longer be working with Volkova.

On 22 May 2014, both singers introduced their appearance in Cornetto Russia's A Sight of Cupid project while at the Cannes Film Festival. Both separately recorded a song and a video, titled "Love in Every Moment".

The duo's most recent appearance together was at the 25th anniversary celebration of the children's musical group Neposedy, of which both were members before the formation of t.A.T.u. Katina performed her song "All Around the World", and together with Volkova, sang "Нас не догонят" ("Not Gonna Get Us").

Acting career
Katina made her film debut alongside Julia Volkova and Mischa Barton in the 2008 film You and I, the story of two teenage girls who meet and fall in love at a Moscow t.A.T.u. concert. The film is based on the novel t.A.T.u. Come Back, itself loosely based on the duo's career and lives.

Katina voiced the fairy Zarina in the Russian dub of the 2014 Disney film The Pirate Fairy.
Also in 2014, she appeared in the short film Together Apart, playing one of the cupids. Julia Volkova had a similar role in the production.

Discography

Studio albums

EPs

Live albums

Singles

As lead artist

As featured artist

Promotional singles

Other appearances

As songwriter

Music videos

Video releases

References

External links

 
 t.A.T.u. official website (archived)
 

1984 births
Living people
English-language singers from Russia
Russian LGBT rights activists
Singers from Moscow
Russian pop singers
Russian rock singers
Russian sopranos
Russian expatriates in the United States
Eastern Orthodox Christians from Russia
T.A.T.u.
Russian Orthodox Christians from Russia
Russian child singers
Spanish-language singers of Russia
20th-century Russian women singers
20th-century Russian singers
21st-century Russian women singers
21st-century Russian singers
Women in electronic music
Eurovision Song Contest entrants of 2003
Eurovision Song Contest entrants for Russia